Starosoldovo (İśke Saldaw) is a rural locality (a village) in Badryashevsky Selsoviet, Tatyshlinsky District, Bashkortostan, Russia. The population was 134 as of 2010. There are 3 streets.

Geography 
Starosoldovo is located 22 km north of Verkhniye Tatyshly (the district's administrative centre) by road. Kalmiyary is the nearest rural locality.

References 

Rural localities in Tatyshlinsky District